Trevor Berbick (1 August 1954 – 28 October 2006) was a Jamaican professional boxer who competed from 1976 to 2000. He won the WBC heavyweight title in 1986 by defeating Pinklon Thomas, then lost it in his first defense in the same year to Mike Tyson. Berbick was the last boxer to fight Muhammad Ali, defeating him in 1981 by unanimous decision.

As an amateur, Berbick won a bronze medal in the heavyweight division at the 1975 Pan American Games. In both his early and late professional career he held the Canadian heavyweight title twice, from 1979 to 1986 and 1999 to 2001. Berbick is the only boxer to have fought Muhammad Ali, Larry Holmes, and Mike Tyson.

Amateur career
At 21, Berbick represented his native Jamaica in the 1976 Summer Olympics in Montreal, Quebec, Canada as a heavyweight boxer, despite having had only 11 prior amateur bouts. His lack of experience was evident as he lost to the eventual silver medalist, Mircea Şimon of Romania. However, he still displayed a lot of promise as a young heavyweight boxer. The previous year, in his only bout at the Pan American Games in Mexico City, Berbick lost a decision to future heavyweight champion Michael Dokes in the semi-finals, winning a bronze medal.

Leroy Caldwell, a boxer who fought almost all notable top-ranked heavyweights of the 1970s and early 1980s, including several world champions, recalled that Berbick was his most talented opponent.

Professional career
Berbick left Jamaica after the Olympics. He opted to settle in Montreal and fight professionally out of Halifax. He won his first 11 fights (10 by knockout) before suffering his first pro loss to another rising contender, Bernardo Mercado, on 3 April 1979. As an amateur, Berbick had soundly beaten Mercado. However, with 10 seconds remaining in the first round of their only professional meeting, Berbick walked into a punch and was knocked out. 

A 1980 upset of ex-champ John Tate (9th-round KO) secured a title shot against Larry Holmes on 11 April 1981, but Berbick lost a 15-round unanimous decision. In his second fight after the loss, he beat 39-year-old Muhammad Ali by unanimous decision in the final fight of Ali's career.

In 1982, he beat undefeated prospect Greg Page, and in 1984 he moved to Miramar, Florida and signed with promoter Don King. Wins over undefeated Mitch "Blood" Green and David Bey scored him another title fight.

Berbick won the WBC world heavyweight title by upsetting Pinklon Thomas with a unanimous decision on 22 March 1986. The champion Thomas was a 6.5-1 favorite, however Berbick won a battle of attrition by wearing Thomas down with his strength and quickness.  Almost knocking down Thomas in the 11th round with a powerful left hook.  Both fighter's faces showed the "meanness and toughness" of the battle; Berbick marked around both eyes, Thomas cut in the corner of his left eye.  The scores for Berbick were 115/113 twice, and 115/114.  The Associated Press (AP) scored it 116-113 for Berbick.

However, his reign as champion would be brief.

On 22 November, in his first defense of the title, Berbick took on Mike Tyson, who was looking to break Floyd Patterson's record and become, at the age of twenty, the youngest ever heavyweight champion. In the second round, Tyson dropped Berbick with a quick knockdown. Berbick was quickly overwhelmed by his opponent and late in the round, he went down again. The champion rose to his feet, but immediately stumbled backward and fell back to the canvas. Berbick tried twice more to make it to his feet but fell both times, and referee Mills Lane stopped counting and waved the fight off to end Berbick's reign as champion.

In 1991, he traveled to the UWFi promotion in Japan to fight Nobuhiko Takada in a "boxer vs. wrestler" bout. Berbick claimed that he had been double-crossed and that he had expected the fight to be like American kickboxing, but it turned out that the rules allowed Takada to kick Berbick below the belt, and according to UWFi trainer Pat McCarthy, "no rules were ever changed, and [Berbick] just never wanted to listen". Berbick refused to mount any offense, instead repeatedly complaining to the referee as Takada kicked him repeatedly in the legs. Takada claimed victory by default when Berbick exited the ring.

Berbick resumed his boxing career in 1994, frequently fighting on the USA Tuesday Night Fights. He would score a mild upset over Melvin Foster but would go on to lose to prospects such as Jimmy Thunder and Hasim Rahman. He eventually fought his last bout in 2000 against Canadian journeyman Shane Sutcliffe, winning a 12-round unanimous decision. Afterwards, a CAT scan revealed a blood clot in his brain and his boxing license was revoked. His final professional record was 49 wins (33 by knockout), 11 losses, and 1 draw.

Outside the ring
Berbick was a preacher at the Moments of Miracles Pentecostal church in Las Vegas.

Rape conviction
Berbick was arrested on a number of occasions throughout his life and was sentenced in Florida to 5 years in prison for raping his children's babysitter in 1992. He served only 15 months. In 1997, he violated his parole and was deported from the United States to Canada.  Due to his legal issues, he also had problems staying in Canada, losing his landed immigrant status and being ordered back to Jamaica in 1999.  Later in 1999 he won the right to remain in Canada.

Feud with Larry Holmes
Berbick had a well-publicized feud with Larry Holmes, whom he fought in the ring in 1981. Their feud culminated in a public confrontation and brawl in 1991, which was caught on tape. After a verbal altercation indoors, Berbick was outside complaining about being kicked and punched by Larry Holmes when Holmes climbed atop a parked car and launched himself at Berbick. Holmes was furious with Berbick badmouthing his family. The footage ends as the two are separated by police and others.

Retirement
Berbick retired in Florida to be with his wife and four children (he had three children with his first wife in Montreal) and started to train boxers at Kenny Barrett's Gym in Tamarac, Florida. Berbick's problems escalated. He was again deported from the U.S. on 2 December 2002.

Death
On 28 October 2006, Berbick was murdered at a church in Norwich, Jamaica, by an assailant wielding a  steel pipe. He sustained repeated blows to the head and died at the scene.

Police arrested two men, one of whom was Berbick's 20-year-old nephew Harold Berbick, in connection with the murder. They were interrogated at the Port Antonio police station in Portland early on the morning of 29 October. Local residents indicated that the suspect was involved in a land dispute with Berbick. On 3 November it was reported that Berbick's nephew, 20-year-old Harold Berbick, and an unidentified 18-year-old man had been charged with his murder by Jamaican police. On 20 December 2007, Harold Berbick was convicted for the murder of his uncle. His alleged accomplice, Kenton Gordon, was convicted of manslaughter and both men were sentenced on 11 January 2008. Harold Berbick was sentenced to life in prison; Kenton Gordon was sentenced to fourteen years in prison. 

Trevor Berbick was buried at the Berbick family plot in Norwich, Port Antonio, Portland, Jamaica.

Professional boxing record

References

External links

1954 births
2006 deaths
2006 murders in North America
Boxers at the 1976 Summer Olympics
Black Canadian boxers
Deaths by beating
Jamaican male boxers
Jamaican emigrants to Canada
Jamaican murder victims
Male murder victims
Sportspeople convicted of crimes
Canadian people convicted of rape
Olympic boxers of Jamaica
Boxers at the 1975 Pan American Games
Pan American Games bronze medalists for Jamaica
People deported from the United States
People from Port Antonio
People murdered in Jamaica
Sportspeople from Florida
Boxers from Montreal
World Boxing Council champions
Canadian male boxers
World heavyweight boxing champions
Pan American Games medalists in boxing
Medalists at the 1975 Pan American Games